Thomas Horatio Arthur Ernest Cochrane, 1st Baron Cochrane of Cults  (2 April 1857 – 17 January 1951), was a Scottish soldier and Liberal Unionist politician. He was Under-Secretary of State for the Home Department under Arthur Balfour between 1902 and 1905.

Background and education
Cochrane was the second son of Thomas Cochrane, 11th Earl of Dundonald, and Louisa Harriet, daughter of William Mackinnon, and the younger brother of Douglas Cochrane, 12th Earl of Dundonald. He was educated at Eton and Cheltenham College.

Military career
Cochrane was an honorary lieutenant colonel of the 4th Battalion Argyll and Sutherland Highlanders, and served in the 93rd Highlanders and the Scots Guards. He served in the Second Boer War, where he was Deputy Assistant Adjutant-General. He was also a lieutenant colonel of the 2/7 Black Watch from 1914 to 1917.

Political career
Cochrane sat as Unionist Member of Parliament for North Ayrshire from 1892 to 1910. He was Parliamentary Private Secretary to the Colonial Secretary Joseph Chamberlain from 1895 to 1901 and served in Arthur Balfour's Unionist administration as Under-Secretary of State for the Home Department from August 1902 to 1905. In 1919 he was raised to the peerage as Baron Cochrane of Cults, of Crawford Priory in the County of Fife.

Lord Cochrane of Cults was also a Deputy Lieutenant and Justice of the Peace for Fife. In 1934 he was awarded an honorary Doctorate of Law from the University of St Andrews.

Family
Lord Cochrane of Cults married Lady Gertrude, daughter of George Boyle, 6th Earl of Glasgow, in 1880. They had four sons and four daughters, of whom one son and two daughters predeceased their parents. Their second and third sons respectively, Sir Archibald Cochrane and Air Chief Marshal Sir Ralph Cochrane, both gained distinction. Lady Cochrane of Cults was appointed an OBE in 1920. She died in December 1950, aged 89. Lord Cochrane of Cults only survived her by a month and died in January 1951, aged 93. He was succeeded in the barony by his eldest son Major the Hon. Thomas Cochrane.

Arms

References

External links 
 

1857 births
1951 deaths
People educated at Eton College
People educated at Cheltenham College
Barons in the Peerage of the United Kingdom
Deputy Lieutenants of Fife
Liberal Unionist Party MPs for Scottish constituencies
Cochrane, Thomas
Cochrane, Thomas
Cochrane, Thomas
Cochrane, Thomas
Cochrane, Thomas
British Army personnel of the Second Boer War
British Army personnel of World War I
93rd Regiment of Foot officers
Argyll and Sutherland Highlanders officers
Black Watch officers
Scots Guards officers
Younger sons of earls
Thomas
Barons created by George V